5K resolution refers to display formats with a horizontal resolution of around 5,000 pixels. This resolution is typically used in computer monitors to achieve a higher pixel density, and is not a standard format in digital television and digital cinematography, which feature 4K resolutions and 8K resolutions.

In comparison to 4K UHD, the  5K resolution of  offers 1280 extra columns and 720 extra lines of display area, an increase of 33.% in each dimension. This additional display area can allow 4K content to be displayed at native resolution without filling the entire screen, which means that additional software such as video editing suite toolbars will be available without having to downscale the content previews.

As of 2016, the world uses 1080p as the mainstream HD standard. However, there is a rapid increase in media content being released in 4K and even 5K resolution. Online streaming services such as Netflix and Amazon Video launched videos in 4K resolution in 2014 and are actively expanding their collection of videos in 4K resolution. As 4K content becomes more common, the usefulness of 5K displays in editing and content creation may lead to a higher demand in the future.

History

First camera with 5K video capture
On April 14, 2008, Red Digital Cinema Camera Company launched one of the first cameras capable of video capture at 5K resolutions. Red Epic uses the Mysterium X sensor which has a resolution of 51202700 and can capture at a framerate of up to 100fps. Cameras with 5K resolution are used occasionally for recording films in digital cinematography.

Some photographic still cameras such as DSLRs can exceed 5K resolution when capturing still images, but not when capturing video.

First TV with 5K resolution
Samsung first demonstrated its 105-inch UN105S9W curved OLED TV at CES 2014.

First monitor with 5K resolution
On September 5, 2014, Dell unveiled the first monitor with a 5K resolution, the UltraSharp UP2715K. This monitor featured a 27-inch  display, giving it a pixel density of around 218px/in. To work around this, the UP2715K implemented a system by which the bandwidth of two DisplayPort connections could be combined to achieve 60Hz, using a picture-by-picture mode to virtually treat the display as two smaller  monitors side-by-side and driving each half with a separate DisplayPort connection.

Examples of 5K resolutions

List of devices with 5K resolution

Monitors

Televisions

Display interface and graphics card support
In order to fully utilize a display with a 5K resolution, the source and display both require support for advanced connection interfaces, since traditional interfaces such as VGA or DVI don't provide adequate bandwidth for 5K resolutions at acceptable framerates. The earliest interface to support  at 30Hz or above was DisplayPort, using the HBR2 transmission speed introduced in version 1.2. This could support  at 30Hz with 30bit/px color depth. HBR2 was first implemented in the AMD Radeon HD 6850 and 6870 in October 2010. NVIDIA introduced HBR2 support on their products with the Kepler family of GPUs, starting with the GeForce GTX 680 in March 2012. 

HDMI gained similar capability in version 2.0, which increased the maximum allowed transmission speed to 600MHz TMDS (18Gbit/s).

The NVIDIA GeForce GTX 1080 launched in mid 2016 and was the first graphics card to introduce support for the HBR3 transmission speed defined in version 1.3 of the DisplayPort standard, allowing it to support  at 60Hz with 24bit/px color depth. It was followed shortly by the AMD Radeon RX 480, which introduced support for HBR3 and 600MHz HDMI transmission on the AMD side.

Although 5K 60Hz over a single cable was only made possible in 2016 with the launch of the GeForce 1000 series and Radeon RX 400 series, monitors which predate version 1.3 of the DisplayPort standard such as the Dell UltraSharp UP2715K offer the ability to run at 5K 60Hz by using two HBR2 DisplayPort connections concurrently in a specialized picture-by-picture mode. The Apple Retina 5K iMac released in 2014 used a custom internal interface with 8 lanes of DisplayPort at HBR2 speed (a standard DP connection is 4 lanes) to drive its display panel at 60Hz.

See also

 1080p Full HD – digital video format with a horizontal resolution of 1920×1080
 1440p – digital video format with a vertical resolution of 1440, aimed at non-television computer monitor usage
 21:9 – a common widescreen cinema aspect ratio
 4K resolution – digital video formats with a horizontal resolution of around 4000 pixels
 8K resolution – digital video formats with a horizontal resolution of around 8000 pixels
 10K resolution – digital video formats with a horizontal resolution of around 10,000 pixels, aimed at non-television computer monitor usage
 16K resolution – experimental VR format
 Aspect ratio (image) – proportional relationship between an image's width and height
 Display resolution

References

Digital imaging
Film and video technology
Ultra-high-definition television